Ihor Olehovych Yarovoy (born 8 April 1996) is a Ukrainian professional footballer who plays as an attacking midfielder for German Bayernliga club Türkspor Augsburg.

References

External links
 Profile at Kryvbas Kryvyi Rih 
 
 
 
 

1996 births
Living people
Sportspeople from Kryvyi Rih
Ukrainian footballers
Association football midfielders
FC Hirnyk Kryvyi Rih players
FC Kryvbas Kryvyi Rih players
Ukrainian First League players
Ukrainian Second League players
Bayernliga players
Ukrainian expatriate footballers
Expatriate footballers in Germany
Ukrainian expatriate sportspeople in Germany